The Lyndon B. Johnson Space Center (JSC) is NASA's center for human spaceflight (originally named the Manned Spacecraft Center), where human spaceflight training, research, and flight control are conducted. It was renamed in honor of the late US president and Texas native, Lyndon B. Johnson, by an act of the United States Senate on February 19, 1973.

The center is home to NASA's astronaut corps, and is responsible for training astronauts from both the US and its international partners. It houses the Christopher C. Kraft Jr. Mission Control Center, which has provided the flight control function for every NASA human spaceflight since Gemini 4 (including Apollo, Skylab, Apollo–Soyuz, and Space Shuttle). It is popularly known by its radio call signs "Mission Control" and "Houston".

The original Manned Spacecraft Center grew out of the Space Task Group (STG) headed by Robert R. Gilruth that was formed to coordinate the US crewed spaceflight program. The STG was based at the Langley Research Center in Hampton, Virginia, but reported organizationally to the Goddard Space Flight Center just outside Washington, D.C. To meet the growing needs of the US human spaceflight program, plans began in 1961 to expand its staff to its own organization, and move it to a new facility. This was constructed in 1962 and 1963 on land donated by the Humble Oil company through Rice University, and officially opened its doors in September 1963. Today, JSC is one of ten major NASA field centers.

History

Johnson Space Center has its origins in NASA's Space Task Group (STG). Starting on November 5, 1958, Langley Research Center engineers under Robert R. Gilruth directed Project Mercury and follow-on crewed space programs. The STG originally reported to the Goddard Space Flight Center organization, with a total staff of 45, including 37 engineers, and eight secretaries and human "computers" (women who ran calculations on mechanical adding machines). In 1959, the center added 32 Canadian engineers put out of work by the cancellation of the Avro Canada CF-105 Arrow project. NASA's first administrator, T. Keith Glennan, realized that the growth of the US space program would cause the STG to outgrow the Langley and Goddard centers and require its own location. On January 1, 1961, he wrote a memo to his yet-unnamed successor (who turned out to be James E. Webb), recommending a new site be chosen. Later that year, when President John F. Kennedy set the goal to put a person on the Moon by the end of the decade, it became clear Gilruth would need a larger organization to lead the Apollo Program, with new test facilities and research laboratories.

Site selection

In 1961, Congress held hearings and passed a $1.7 billion 1962 NASA appropriations bill which included $60 million for the new crewed spaceflight laboratory. A set of requirements for the new site was drawn up and released to the Congress and general public. These included: access to water transport by large barges, a moderate climate, availability of all-weather commercial jet service, a well-established industrial complex with supporting technical facilities and labor, close proximity to a culturally attractive community in the vicinity of an institution of higher education, a strong electric utility and water supply, at least  of land, and certain specified cost parameters. In August 1961, Webb asked Associate Director of the Ames Research Center John F. Parsons to head a site-selection team, which included Philip Miller, Wesley Hjornevik, and I. Edward Campagna, the construction
engineer for the STG. The team initially came up with a list of 22 cities based on the climate and water criteria, then cut this to a short list of nine with nearby federal facilities:
 Jacksonville, Florida (Green Cove Springs Naval Air Station)
 Tampa, Florida (MacDill Air Force Base)
 Baton Rouge, Louisiana
 Shreveport, Louisiana (Barksdale Air Force Base)
 Houston, Texas (San Jacinto Ordnance Depot)
 Victoria, Texas (FAA Airport; former Foster Air Force Base)
 Corpus Christi, Texas (Naval Air Station Corpus Christi)
 San Diego, California (Camp Elliott)
 San Francisco, California (Benicia Arsenal)
 
Another 14 sites were then added, including two additional Houston sites chosen because of proximity to the University of Houston and Rice University. The team visited all 23 sites between August 21 and September 7, 1961. During these visits, Massachusetts Governor John A. Volpe and Senator Margaret Chase Smith headed a delegation which exerted particularly strong political pressure, prompting a personal inquiry to Webb from President Kennedy. Senators and congressmen from sites in Missouri and California similarly lobbied the selection team. Proponents of sites in Boston, Massachusetts, Rhode Island, and Norfolk, Virginia, went so far as to make separate presentations to Webb and the headquarters staff, so Webb added these additional sites to the final review.

Following its tour, the team identified MacDill Air Force Base in Tampa as its first choice, based on the fact the Air Force was planning to close down its Strategic Air Command operations there. The Houston Rice University site was second, and the Benicia Ordnance Depot in San Francisco was third. Before a decision could be made, however, the Air Force decided not to close MacDill, omitting it from consideration and moving the Rice University site to first place. Webb informed President Kennedy on September 14 of the decision made by him and deputy administrator Hugh Dryden in two separate memoranda, one reviewing the criteria and procedures, and the other stating: "Our decision is that this laboratory should be located in Houston, Texas, in close association with Rice University and the other educational institutions there and in that region." The Executive Office and NASA made advance notifications of the award, and the public announcement of the location followed on September 19, 1961. According to Texas A&M University historian Henry C. Dethloff, "Although the Houston site neatly fit the criteria required for the new center, Texas undoubtedly exerted an enormous political influence on such a decision. Lyndon B. Johnson was Vice President and head of the Space Council, Albert Thomas headed the House Appropriations Committee, Bob Casey and Olin E. Teague were members of the House Committee on Science and Astronautics, and Teague headed the Subcommittee on Manned Space Flight. Finally, Sam Rayburn was Speaker of the House of Representatives."

At the time, the land was used to graze cattle. On November 1, the conversion of the Task Group to MSC became official.

Construction and early operations

Tracts of land in the vicinity of the Manned Spacecraft Center were either owned or being under exclusive control of Joseph L. Smith & Associates, Inc.
NASA purchased an additional  so the property would face a highway, and the total included another  reserve drilling site. Construction of the center, designed by Charles Luckman, began in April 1962, and Gilruth's new organization was formed and moved to the temporary locations by September. That month, Kennedy gave a speech at Rice University on the US space program. The speech is famous for highlighting the Apollo program, but Kennedy also made reference to the new Center:

The  facility was officially opened for business in September 1963.

Mission Control Center

In 1961, as plans for Project Gemini began, it became increasingly clear that the Mercury Control Center located at the Cape Canaveral Air Force Station launch center would become inadequate to control missions with maneuverable spacecraft such as Gemini and Apollo. Christopher Kraft and three other flight controllers began studying what was needed for an improved control center, and directed a study contract awarded to Philco's Western Development Laboratory. Philco bid on and won the contract to build the electronic equipment for the new Mission Control Center, which would be located in Building 30 of MSC rather than Canaveral or the Goddard Space Flight Center in Maryland. Construction began in 1963.

The new center had two Mission Operations Control Rooms, allowing training and preparation for a later mission to be carried out while a live mission is in progress. It was brought online for testing purposes during the uncrewed Gemini 2 flight in January 1965 and the first crewed Gemini flight, Gemini 3 in March 1965, though the Mercury Control Center still retained primary responsibility for control of these flights. It became fully operational for the flight of Gemini 4 the following June, and has been the primary flight control center for all subsequent US crewed space missions from Project Gemini forward.

NASA named the center the Christopher C. Kraft Jr. Mission Control Center on April 14, 2011.

Apollo program
In addition to housing NASA's astronaut operations, JSC is also the site of the former Lunar Receiving Laboratory, where the first astronauts returning from the Moon were quarantined, and where the majority of lunar samples are stored. The center's Landing and Recovery Division operated MV Retriever in the Gulf of Mexico for Gemini and Apollo astronauts to practice water egress after splashdown.

On February 19, 1973, after Johnson's death, President Richard Nixon signed into law a Senate resolution renaming the Manned Spacecraft Center in honor of Johnson, who as Senate Majority Leader had sponsored the 1958 legislation which created NASA. Dedication ceremonies under the new name were held on August 27 of that year.

One of the artifacts displayed at Johnson Space Center is the Saturn V rocket. It is whole, except for the ring between the S-IC and S-II stages, and the fairing between the S-II and S-IVB stages, and made of actual surplus flight-ready articles. It also has real (though incomplete) Apollo command and service modules, intended to fly in the canceled Apollo 19 mission.

In June 2019, the restored Apollo Mission Control Center was opened for tourists.

Space Shuttle program

In the wake of the January 28, 1986, Space Shuttle Challenger disaster, President Ronald Reagan and First Lady Nancy Reagan traveled to JSC on January 31 to speak at a memorial service honoring the astronauts. It was attended by 6,000 NASA employees and 4,000 guests, as well as by the families of the crew. During the ceremony, an Air Force band led the singing of "God Bless America" as NASA T-38 Talon supersonic jets flew directly over the scene in the traditional missing-man formation. All activities were broadcast live by the national television and radio networks.

A similar memorial service was held at the Johnson Space Center on February 4, 2003, for the astronauts who perished in the Space Shuttle Columbia disaster three days before, which was attended by President George W. Bush and First Lady Laura Bush. Although that service was broadcast live by the national television and radio networks, it was geared mainly to NASA employees and the families of the astronauts. A second service for the nation was led by Vice-President Dick Cheney and his wife Lynne at Washington National Cathedral two days later.

On September 13, 2008, Hurricane Ike hit Galveston as a category 2 hurricane and caused minor damage to the Mission Control Center and other buildings at JSC. The storm damaged the roofs of several hangars for the T-38 Talons at Ellington Field.

Facilities

The Johnson Space Center is home to Christopher C. Kraft Jr. Mission Control Center (MCC-H), the NASA control center that coordinates and monitors all human spaceflight for the United States. MCC-H directed all Space Shuttle missions, and currently directs American activities aboard the International Space Station. The Apollo Mission Control Center, a National Historic Landmark, is in Building 30. From the moment a crewed spacecraft clears its launch tower until it lands back on Earth, it is in the hands of Mission Control. The MCC houses several Flight Control Rooms, from which flight controllers coordinate and monitor the spaceflights. The rooms have many computer resources to monitor, command, and communicate with spacecraft. When a mission is underway, the rooms are staffed around the clock, usually in three shifts.

JSC handles most of the planning and training of the US astronaut corps and houses training facilities such as the Sonny Carter Training Facility and the Neutral Buoyancy Laboratory, a critical component in training astronauts for spacewalks. The Neutral Buoyancy Laboratory provides a controlled neutral buoyancy environment—a very large pool containing about 6.2 million US gallons (23,000 m3) of water where astronauts train to practice extra-vehicular activity tasks while simulating zero-g conditions. The facility provides preflight training in becoming familiar with crew activities and with the dynamics of body motion under weightless conditions.

Building 31-N houses the Lunar Sample Laboratory Facility, which stores, analyzes, and processes most of the samples returned from the Moon during the Apollo program.

The center is also responsible for direction of operations at White Sands Test Facility in New Mexico, which served as a backup Space Shuttle landing site and would have been the coordinating facility for the Constellation program, which was planned to replace the Shuttle program after 2010, but was canceled in 2009.

The visitor center has been the adjacent Space Center Houston since 1994; JSC Building 2 previously housed the visitor center.

The Johnson Space Center Heliport  is located on the campus.

Personnel and training

About 3,200 civil servants, including 110 astronauts, are employed at Johnson Space Center. The bulk of the workforce consists of over 11,000 contractors. As of October 2014, Stinger Ghaffarian Technologies took over United Space Alliance's primary contract.  the center's director is Vanessa E. Wyche.

NASA's astronaut training is conducted at the Johnson Space Center. Astronaut candidates receive training on spacecraft systems and in basic sciences including mathematics, guidance and navigation, oceanography, orbital dynamics, astronomy, and physics. Candidates are required to complete military water survival prior to beginning their flying instruction. Candidates are also required to become scuba-qualified for extravehicular training and are required to pass a swimming test. EVA training is conducted at the Sonny Carter Training Facility. Candidates are also trained to deal with emergencies associated with hyperbaric and hypobaric atmospheric pressures and are given exposure to the microgravity of space flight. Candidates maintain their flying proficiency by flying 15 hours per month in NASA's fleet of T-38 jets based at nearby Ellington Field.

Research
Johnson Space Center leads NASA's human spaceflight-related scientific and medical research programs. Technologies developed for spaceflight are now in use in many areas of medicine, energy, transportation, agriculture, communications, and electronics.

The Astromaterials Research and Exploration Science (ARES) office performs the physical science research at the center. ARES directs and manages all functions and activities of the ARES scientists who perform basic research in earth, planetary, and space sciences. ARES scientists and engineers provide support to the human and robotic spaceflight programs. The responsibilities of ARES also include interaction with the Office of Safety and Mission Assurance and the Human Space Flight Programs.

Johnson Space Center was granted a five-year, $120-million extension of its agreement with the National Space Biomedical Research Institute at Baylor College of Medicine to study the health risks related to long-duration space flight. The extension will allow a continuation of biomedical research in support of a long-term human presence in space started by the institute and NASA's Human Research Program through 2012.

The Prebreathe Reduction Program is a research study program at the JSC that is currently being developed to improve the safety and efficiency of space walks from the International Space Station.

The Overset Grid-Flow software was developed at Johnson Space Center in collaboration with NASA Ames Research Center. The software simulates fluid flow around solid bodies using computational fluid dynamics.

Memorial Grove
Astronauts, center directors, and other NASA employees are memorialized in a Memorial Grove near the main entrance and visitor badging center (building 110). Trees dedicated to the memory of astronauts and center directors are in a round cluster closest to the entrance, other employees are memorialized behind along a road on the facility leading to the main entrance.

Space Shuttle retirement
JSC put in a bid to display one of the retired Space Shuttle orbiters, but was not selected.

Gallery

See also

 Johnson Space Center shooting
 Yuri Gagarin Cosmonaut Training Center

References

Further reading

External links

 Lyndon B. Johnson Space Center
 Suddenly, tomorrow came... A history of the Johnson Space Center (PDF format) 1993
 JSC Celebrates 40 Years of Human Space Flight September 2001
 Roundup, official newsletter Roundup archive 1961-2001 Roundup archive 2003-present 
 NASA Johnson Space Center Oral History Project – Interview with Thomas W. 'Tommy' Holloway
 "America's Space Program: Exploring a New Frontier", a National Park Service Teaching with Historic Places (TwHP) lesson plan
 Aviation: From Sand Dunes to Sonic Booms, a National Park Service Discover Our Shared Heritage Travel Itinerary
 Mission Control Archive Footage

 
Buildings of the United States government in Texas
NASA facilities
Buildings and structures in Houston
Tourist attractions in Houston
Space technology research institutes
Economy of Houston
1961 establishments in Texas
Lyndon B. Johnson
Oral history